In Greek mythology, Trechus (Ancient Greek: Τρῆχόν) was a Aetolian spearman who participated in the Trojan War. During the siege of Troy, he was slain by the Trojan hero Hector and the war-god Ares.

Note

References 

 Homer, The Iliad with an English Translation by A.T. Murray, Ph.D. in two volumes. Cambridge, MA., Harvard University Press; London, William Heinemann, Ltd. 1924. . Online version at the Perseus Digital Library.
 Homer, Homeri Opera in five volumes. Oxford, Oxford University Press. 1920. . Greek text available at the Perseus Digital Library.

Achaeans (Homer)